Ribes maximowiczii is a species of Ribes found in China, Japan, Korea, and Russia at elevations of 900–2700 meters. It is a dioecious shrub.

References

External links
 
 

maximowiczii
Dioecious plants